2-Iminothiolane is a cyclic thioimidate compound also known as Traut's reagent. It is a thiolating reagent that reacts with primary amine groups, such as those of amino acids, to form sulfhydryl groups.

Application 

2-Iminothiolane reacts with primary amines efficiently at pH 7 to 9, creating amidine compounds with a sulfhydryl group. Thus it allows for crosslinking or labeling of molecules such as proteins through use of disulfide or thioether conjugation. It was first used to thiolate a subunit of ribosome in E. coli in 1973 by Robert Traut, its namesake, and his colleagues.

It also reacts with aliphatic and phenolic hydroxyl groups at high pH, albeit at a much slower rate.

References 

Thiolanes
Imines